Georgian Journal was a Georgian weekly newspaper published by the Palitra Media Holding. It was one of the few newspapers in Georgia to be printed fully in English. As of December 29, 2015 the paper is no longer issued and has merged with Georgia Today. Georgian Journal functions only as an online news agency via its website.

References

Newspapers published in Georgia (country)
Mass media in Tbilisi